The Aerokopter AK1-3 is a Ukrainian helicopter, designed and produced by Aerokopter (also spelled "Aerocopter") of Kharkiv. The aircraft is supplied as complete ready-to-fly-aircraft.

Some sources refer to the AK1-3 as the Sanka or San'ka while others do not.

Design and development
The AK1-3 was designed to comply with the Ukrainian AP-27 rules, which are similar to the European Aviation Safety Agency CS-27 standard. The aircraft features a single main rotor with a tail rotor, a two-seats-in side-by-side configuration enclosed cockpit, skid-type landing gear and a four-cylinder, air-cooled, four-stroke,  Subaru EJ25 automotive engine.

The main transmission consists of belt drives, with the tail rotor driven by a solid shaft.

The design received a Ukrainian type certificate in 2006.

In 2009 Aerokopter (DB Aercopters) was acquired by the Perla Group of companies Perla Aviation division, with the stated intention of moving the assembly line of the AK1-3 to the United Arab Emirates (UAE). 

By December 2020 the company reported 102 helicopters had been delivered.

Operational history
By December 2020 one 2008 model AK1-3, serial number 1001, had been registered in the United States with the Federal Aviation Administration in the Special Certificate of Airworthiness Experimental-Exhibition category. It was registered in January 2018. The same aircraft, serial number 1001, had been previously registered with Transport Canada in the Special Certificate of Airworthiness - Limited Category from 2009 to 2015, prior to being exported to the US in 2015.

Variants

Aerokopter ZA-6 San'kaOriginal design forming the basis of the AK1, with a five-bladed main rotor and powered by a  Subaru EJ22 converted automobile engine.
Aerokopter AK1-5A development prototype modified from a ZA-6 with a five-bladed main rotor. Registered as GL-0478 and displayed at the 2002 Kiev Manufacturing and Security Exhibition.
Aerokopter AK1-3A second stage of development resulted in the AK1-3 with a three-bladed rotor, (also displayed incomplete at the 2002 Kiev exhibition). Other changes included a tailplane with end-plate fins and tail rotor transferred to the right side of the tail boom.

Specifications (AK1-3)

See also

Notes

External links

New 
Photo of the Aerokopter AK1-3
Photo of the Aerokopter AK1-3

2000s Ukrainian helicopters
Single-engined piston helicopters